Gionne Koopman (born 28 December 1991) is a South African cricketer. He was included in the Border cricket team squad for the 2015 Africa T20 Cup.

He was the leading run-scorer in the 2017–18 CSA Provincial One-Day Challenge tournament for Border, with 431 runs in eight matches. In September 2018, he was named in Northerns' squad for the 2018 Africa T20 Cup.

References

External links
 

1991 births
Living people
South African cricketers
Border cricketers
Northerns cricketers
Warriors cricketers